JSS (Jagadguru Sri Shivarathreeshwara) Academy of Technical Education is an educational institute situated at Avenue Droopnath Ramphul, Bonne Terre, Vacoas, Mauritius. The institute is affiliated to Visvesvaraya Technological University, Belgaum. JSSATE, Mauritius is managed by the JSS Education Foundation Pvt. Ltd. Mysore, India, which runs under the aegis of JSS Mahavidyapeetha (JSSMVP). The college is approved by the Government of Mauritius, registered and accredited by Tertiary Education Commission (TEC), Mauritius.

Courses Offered

B.E. (Bachelor of Engineering) with specialization in:
 Civil Engineering
 Computer Science and Engineering
 Electrical and Electronics Engineering
 Electronics and Communication Engineering

References

External links
 Official Site

Universities in Mauritius
Affiliates of Visvesvaraya Technological University